Púchov is an industrial town in the centre of Púchov District in Slovakia, with a population close to 18,000.

Geography
It is located on the main train line between Bratislava and Košice. It is half way between Trenčín  and Žilina, two major Slovak cities, approximately 30 minutes train from both cities.

The Váh river crosses Púchov, and there is a small dam open to public crossing.

The health resort Nimnica (until 1990 part of Púchov) is situated in the vicinity and is a starting point for tours to Javorníky and White Carpathians mountains.

Parts:

History
The nearness of the Váh river and town's strategic location contributed to create cultural and social relations, which were a part of its history. The first written reference dates back to 1243, when Béla IV., King of Hungary, signed his gift certificate to Vychlap Bechend. In this reference are also mentioned Leustrak's son and Puch from his immediate vicinities. The word "puch" is of Indo-European origin and it can be translated as "puffed up", "haughty" and "ov" is a possessive suffix, therefore this name can be translated as a former "land of Puch".  There exist another version, that origin of town's name originates from the word "Pochov", which denotes a place many deceased from the whole vicinities were buried in the past. This claim was supported by many archaeological excavations of the graves throughout the centuries. 
Púchov vicinities, especially Púchovská skala (Púchov rock) was settled earlier during palaeolithic period. The excavations give evidence of settlements since the early Stone Age to the Roman period. During 1888-1894 an Austrian Army commissioned officer, an amateur archaeologist, baron Emil Friedrich Johannes Hoenning O'Carroll carried out an exploration of  Púchovská Skala and his discovery of two bronze swords explained the town's ancient history. His discoveries later contributed to the origin of the official archaeological name Púchov culture. During the 7th – 8th centuries was the town settled by Slavs and in the 9th century the Moravian settlements shared the most expansion. In 1469 Matthias Corvinus, the King of Hungary, gave Púchov homestead to the Marczibányis, who were the lineal descendants of Púchovs since the 13th century.

Demographics
According to the 2001 census, the town had 18,833 inhabitants. 97.4% of inhabitants were Slovaks, 1.3% Czechs and 0.2% Roma. The religious make-up was 71.4% Roman Catholics, 13.8% Lutherans, and 11.3% people with no religious affiliation.

Economy
It is a strong industry base - home to Matador and Continental Tire plants, producers of pneumatic tyres, and Makyta, a producer of fashion clothes. Matador is a 20-minute walk from the train station in Púchov, while the city center is a 10-minute walk in the other direction.

Sport
The number one sport in the town is football. The local team FK Matador Púchov had several successful seasons in the Slovak highest league, but currently is only in the Slovak second league. Among other sports, there has been a long tradition of swimming. Several of the best swimmers made it to the European championship.

Some other sport clubs worth mentioning are volleyball and handball.

The local ice hockey team is actually the Slovak National Ice Hockey Team under 20. The team named "Slovakia 20" is a permanent member of the highest Ice Hockey league. This was done as an experiment to help the young players to get more tough matches and increase their motivation.

Cyclists, Peter and Martin Velits, come from Púchov as well.

Slovak Bandy Association has organised rink bandy practice in Púchov.

Culture and education
The town has several high schools and a branch of the Slovak University of Technology.

Twin towns — sister cities

Púchov is twinned with:

 Babruysk, Belarus
 Bela Cerkev, Ukraine
 Hlinsko, Czech Republic
 Omsk, Russia
 Stara Pazova, Serbia

References

External links
 
 
 

Cities and towns in Slovakia